In 1913 Colorado, Idaho, Indiana, Kansas, North Carolina, South Dakota, and Wyoming joined the list of states and territories providing license plates to vehicle owners, and Montana and Nevada entered the prestate era. There were now 35 states and 3 territories that were issuing license plates and 8 other states requiring owners to provide their own license plates.

Passenger baseplates
In the table below, a light green background indicates that the owner of the vehicle was required to provide their own license plates. These plates are called "prestate" by most collectors. In the prestate era many states only provided the license plate number on a small disc or on paper, and the owner was required to have their license plate(s) made. These early license plates were created from kits that could be purchased at a hardware store, may have been available from automobile clubs or associations, they were forged by blacksmiths or other tradesmen, or the owner may have made their own plate with whatever materials they had on hand. Prestate plates were made from a variety of materials, but most often were made of leather, steel, or wood.

See also

Antique vehicle registration
Electronic license plate
Motor vehicle registration
Vehicle license

References

External links

1913 in the United States
1913